The Ilyushin I-21, (Istrebitel-21, fighter-21), also known as TsKB-32, was a single-engined, single-seat fighter produced in the USSR in 1936-7 in response to a government specification.

Design and development
The I-21 was an all-metal, low-wing, cantilever monoplane with retractable undercarriage and a closed cockpit. The wings were sharply tapered with straight trailing edges, which introduced sweepback on the leading edge. Two specially modified Mikulin AM-34RNF (also written AM-34FRN) liquid-cooled V-12 engines provided the power via a non-reducing gearbox, which was used only to raise the thrust line, and enable the use of shorter undercarriage legs.

Cooling for the first prototype's engine used an evaporative system which dispensed with radiators and used condensers built into the surface of the wing centre section.  The second prototype was fitted with a conventional cooling system using ethylene glycol coolant and a retractable radiator. Flight trials started but soon showed that the evaporative cooling system was inadequate with both the engine and the wing centre section overheating. Ilyushin was also very aware of the vulnerability of the system to combat damage, but he was ordered by GUAP to use this system. Further development was halted in 1939 and the I-21 designation was re-used for the Pashinin I-21.

Variants
Data from:'OKB Ilyushin
TsKB 32 (I-21 1st prototype) with evaporative cooling
TsKB 52 (I-21 2nd prototype) with conventional ethylene glycol cooling system, not completed due to engine delivery problems.

Specifications (I-21)

See also

References

1930s Soviet fighter aircraft
I-021
Abandoned military aircraft projects of the Soviet Union
Single-engined tractor aircraft
Low-wing aircraft
Aircraft first flown in 1936